Hackamore can refer to:

The classic hackamore (Spanish: jaquima) of the vaquero tradition, featuring a bosal noseband
The mechanical hackamore
Any one of a number of designs of bitless bridle, sometimes also referred to as "Hackamores," referencing any type of headgear that uses a noseband in lieu of a bit (horse)
Hackamore, California
the jug sling knot